in Spanish and  in Basque, is a village located in the province of Álava, (Basque Country, Spain). It is also the seat of the municipality of Iruña de Oca and the most populated village of the region named Cuadrilla de Añana.

Until its merger with the municipality of Iruña in 1976, Nanclares de la Oca was a separate municipality which comprised the villages of Nanclares de la Oca, Montevite and Ollávarre.

The village is located in the western part of the Llanada Alavesa (plains of Álava), just about 12 kilometers far from the capital city of the Basque Country, Vitoria-Gasteiz.

HistoryÁlava Pueblo A Pueblo

First settlements and Roman Age 
The first term related to Nanclares De La Oca was found in a Celtiberian stela which referred to the towns as "". Is for this reason, that experts think there were pre-Roman settlements in the area.

Roman ruins have also been found not just in Iruña-Veleia, an ancient city located near Nanclares, but also in some recent excavations made in Nanclares. The arrival of the Romans changed completely the style of life and turned Iruña Veleia and its surroundings into an important area.

The Middle Ages 

There are data about several Templar settlements in The Middle Ages. The suffix "" is thought to be related with the Templars, as they called the area where they lived "", which means "The Land of Geese". Still, the origin is not certain.

Until the 19th century 

During the Spanish Independence War there were many English soldiers near the village, especially in the Battle of Vitoria. The soldiers belonged to the fourth and light military divisions, which were under the order of Wellington. Besides, there were some British cavalry troops commanded by Robert Hill, Grant and Ponsonby; and a Portuguese one led by D'urban. Their mission was to wait in Nanclares de la Oca until Hill's troops conquered the heights of La Puebla; so that they could cross the Zadorra river and attack directly the rival.

The Carlist Wars did also take place in Nanclares. As a consequence, nowadays there are three castles (Almoreta, Vayagüen and El Encinal) in the surroundings.

In the second half of the century a spa, which was known as Bolen or Bolem, was built. It had a great success; moreover, it was catalogued as one of the bests in Europe. At the end of the 19th century, the spa fell in decline and had to be closed. Some years later, in 1914, La Mennais Brothers settled in the area, rebuilt and restore the spa, and turned the place into seminary, where future Brothers were indoctrinated. Nowadays, the building is a Secondary School called .

20th and 21st centuries 

In the 20th century, the town grew considerably not just in length, but also in terms of population in consequence of the various migratory movements inside the Iberian Peninsula.

In the Spanish Civil War a concentration camp was built near the town. It was used during the war and in the post-war era; many republican prisoners were kept in there. In the early 1980s, it was remodeled and a jail was opened in its place.

In 2011 a new jail was built in San Miguel mountain. This one is much bigger and modern than the previous and is supposed to replace the old one.

Population 

The first census dates of 1802, at that time there were only 47 people living in Nanclares. The following official census date of 1960: 1.164 people; 1970: 1.369; 1978: 1.531; 1981: 1.345.

From the year 2000 on, a census has been made every year.

Tourist places

This square is located in the centre of the town, it is dominated by the fountain "", built in 1901, and the ancient wash-house.
From the square, a little stone bridge can be seen; a stream called El Torco goes under it, which turns into a waterfall in winter.

The three castles 

These three small towers were built by the Isabelline army during the Carlist Wars in the 19th century. They were used to guard, communicate and defend the area. They are called: Vayagüen, Almoreta and El Encinal.
It was used as an optic telegraph. It is located in the East, in front of the old jail.
Almoreta: This small castle can be found in the south part of the town, behind the train tracks. This tower, which is the smallest one, just , was used both as an optic telegraph and a fort. Nowadays it is a youth hostel.

El Calero 

 was a lime oven built in 1850. It was a non-stop oven, since it was very high (15 m) and stones could be put inside the tower while the ones at the bottom were ready. The stones were heated at 1000C° and the process lasted a week. In 2013 El Calero was rebuilt, and now anyone can visit it.

Notes 

Populated places in Álava
Towns in Spain